San Pedro is a department of Jujuy Province (Argentina).

Towns
La Esperanza

References 

Departments of Jujuy Province